Joseph John Skibinski (December 23, 1928 – August 18, 2015) was an American football guard who played in the National Football League. He was drafted in the fifteenth round of the 1951 NFL Draft by the Cleveland Browns and later played with the team during the 1952 NFL season. After two years away from the NFL, he played with the Green Bay Packers for two seasons.

He was voted 2nd Team All-Big Ten following the 1951 season.

Following his NFL career, he became a high school educator and coach in his native Illinois.  One of his sons, John was one of his better players; he following his father's footsteps to Purdue and the NFL and the USFL.

References

Players of American football from Chicago
Cleveland Browns players
Green Bay Packers players
American football offensive guards
Purdue Boilermakers football players
1928 births
2015 deaths